Wadi Nisnas is a formerly mixed Jewish and Arab neighborhood in the city of Haifa in northern Israel, which is becoming mixed again. Nisnas is the Arabic word for mongoose, an indigenous animal. The wadi has a population of about 8,000 inhabitants. 

Wadi Nisnas was developed at the end of the nineteenth century as a Christian-Arab neighborhood outside the walls of Haifa, after 1948 the neighborhood become the center of Haifa Arab community, providing the community with education, religious, and other civic and cultural services. The current Israeli Central Bureau of Statistics census estimates that 66% of the Wadi Nisnas population are Christians, 31.5% are Muslims, and the rest are Jews.  

Wadi Nisnas is the setting for the 1987 novel, Hatsotsrah ba-Vadi (Hebrew: "Trumpet in the Wadi") by Sami Michael. It centers on the love story between a young Israeli Arab woman and a new Jewish immigrant from Russia.

Bibliography
 Sami Michael, Trumpet in the Wadi. New York:Simon & Schuster, 2003, translated by Yael Lotan.

External links

 Wadi Nisnas at the Haifa travel guide.

See also
German Colony, Haifa
Paris Square (Haifa)
Wadi Salib

References

Arab Israeli culture in Haifa
Arab localities in Israel
Arab Christian communities in Israel
Neighborhoods of Haifa